The Death Valley pupfish (Cyprinodon salinus), also known as Salt Creek pupfish, is a small species of fish in the family Cyprinodontidae found only in Death Valley National Park, California, United States. There are two recognized subspecies: C. s. salinus and C. s. milleri. The Death Valley pupfish is endemic to two small, isolated locations and currently classified as endangered.

Description 

The Death Valley pupfish is a small, silvery colored fish with 6–9 vertical dark bands on its sides.

The males, often appearing in larger sizes compared to females, turn bright blue during mating season, April through October. The females, along with premature pupfish, tend to have tanned backs with iridescent, silvery sides. Both males and females have plump bodies with rounded fins, a squashed head and an upturned mouth.

Distribution and habitat
They are thought to be the remainders of a large ecosystem of fish species that lived in Lake Manly, which dried up at the end of the last ice age leaving the present-day Death Valley.

The Salt Creek subspecies is also found at River Springs and Soda Lake, in Death Valley National Park.

Conservation
The Death Valley pupfish has been classified as endangered by the IUCN because of its extremely restricted distribution (if the two extant locations were treated as a single unit, it would be considered critically endangered). Numbers of individuals at the locations are highly seasonally variable, and fluctuate with water level and flow volume. While the entire range of the species is located in a protected area, it may be under threat from accidental introduction of non-native species, local catastrophic events, and excessive pumping of the aquifer that feeds the habitat.

See also 
 Tecopa Pupfish, Cyprinodon nevadensis calidae (extinct)
Saratoga pupfish, Cyprinodon nevadensis nevadensis, from Saratoga Springs at the south end of Death Valley
Amargosa pupfish, Cyprinodon nevadensis amargosa, from the Amargosa River northwest of Saratoga Springs
Devils Hole pupfish, Cyprinodon diabolis, critically endangered and found in Devils Hole, in western Nevada
Shoshone Pupfish, Cyprinodon nevadensis shoshone
Desert pupfish Cyprinodon macularius
Owens pupfish Cyprinodon radiosus

References

Further reading

External links 

 

Cyprinodon
Death Valley
Endemic fauna of California
Fauna of the Mojave Desert
Fish of the Western United States
Freshwater fish of the United States
Natural history of Inyo County, California
Taxa named by Robert Rush Miller
Fish described in 1943
Endangered fish
Endangered fauna of California